The Voice of Germany is a German reality talent show to find new singing talent. The seventh season premiered on October 19, 2017 on ProSieben and Sat.1. Based on the reality singing competition The Voice of Holland, the series was created by Dutch television producer John de Mol. It is part of an international series. Haber, Catterfeld and Michi & Smudo as coaches of the previous season would return, while Mark Forster joined as a new coach on the show, replacing Andreas Bourani. Schölermann and Gercke as hosts of the previous season would return.

Coaches and Hosts 
It was announced that Andreas Bourani would not be returning as a coach. Mark Forster was announced to take his place, following his success on The Voice Kids. Samu Haber, Yvonne Catterfield and Michi & Smudo all returned as coaches.

Teams
Colour key:
  Winner
  Runner-up
  Third place
  Fourth place 
  Eliminated in the Semi-final
  Eliminated in the Sing Off
  Artist was stolen by another coach at the Battles
  Eliminated in the Battles

Final

References

External links
 Official website on ProSieben.de
 The Voice of Germany on fernsehserien.de

2017 German television seasons
7